The 2019 Atlantic 10 Conference baseball tournament took place from May 22 to 25. The top seven regular season finishers of the league's twelve teams met in the double-elimination tournament held at Jim Houlihan Park at Jack Coffey Field, the home field of Fordham in The Bronx. The winner, Fordham, earned the conference's automatic bid to the 2019 NCAA Division I baseball tournament.

Seeding and format
The tournament used the same format adopted in 2014, with the top seven finishers from the regular season seeded one through seven. The top seed received a single bye while remaining seeds played on the first day.

Results

Conference championship

References

Tournament
Atlantic 10 Conference Baseball Tournament
Atlantic 10 Conference baseball tournament
Atlantic 10 Conference baseball tournament
2010s in the Bronx
College baseball tournaments in New York (state)
Baseball competitions in New York City
Sports in the Bronx